Carolina (Carla) Romano (born 1969 in Dundee) is a Scottish  journalist and producer of Italian descent. Romano studied French and politics at the University of Dundee  and has a postgraduate diploma in journalism from the University of Strathclyde.

BBC Radio work
Romano began her broadcasting career with Radio Scotland, as a producer and reporter.
Produced the cultural identity documentary series British Like Me and  A Degree of Desperation, a half-hour programme she produced on student prostitution was shortlisted for a Sony Radio Award, but did not collect one. In 1997, Romano worked as a reporter on BBC Radio Scotland's weekly current affairs programmes Eye to Eye and Newsweek. She also produced Radio 5 Live's four-part animal trade documentary series Beastly Business. In 1998, she won a Commission for Racial Equality media award by presenting a BBC radio documentary series on racism in Scotland.

BBC and GMTV television work
Romano moved to television in 1997, reading breakfast and late night bulletins on BBC Scotland, and occasionally reporting on Scottish stories for BBC News 24.
Later she became GMTV's Los Angeles correspondent, (replacing Jackie Brambles).
On 4 March 2010, Romano and GMTV parted company.

References

External links
Carla Romano's official website

1969 births
Living people
Scottish people of Italian descent
People from Dundee
Alumni of the University of Dundee
Alumni of the University of Strathclyde
GMTV presenters and reporters
Journalists from Dundee